Borgaon may refer to:

Borgaon, a village in Solapur district, Maharashtra, India
Borgaon Dam
Borgaon Manju, a town in Akola district, Maharashtra, India
Borgaon, a town in Wardha district, Maharashtra, India
Bhogaon, a major village in Jintur taluka of Parbhani district in Maharashtra, India
Bhogaon, a town and a nagar panchayat in Mainpuri district in the state of Uttar Pradesh, India.